Santa Anita Canyon is a canyon in the San Gabriel Mountains, within the City of Arcadia, CA in Los Angeles County, California.

Geography
Above Irwindale its main stem is known as Santa Anita Creek, which extends another 10 miles (16 km) northwards into the San Gabriel Mountains where the source headwaters of the river are found.  The 'Big Santa Anita Canyon' with Santa Anita Creek is part of the watershed of the Rio Hondo, which flows from the mountains through the San Gabriel Valley and passes through the Whittier Narrows, a natural gap in the hills which form the southern boundary of the San Gabriel Valley.

The Santa Anita Dam and Santa Anita reservoir-flood control basin lies near the mouth of the canyon. The community of Big Santa Anita Canyon is below.

Recreation
Santa Anita Canyon Road, constructed in the 1930s, provides access from Arcadia to the Chantry Flat Recreation Area and the Pack Station, in the Angeles National Forest. Trails lead to Sturtevant Falls and other features.

See also
Chantry Flat
Marie Riedeselle, lived in a cabin in Santa Anita Canyon in 1909

External links
Big Santa Anita Canyon website
Big Santa Anita Canyon links
Santa Anita Dam Riser Modification and Reservoir Sediment Removal Project
 Santa Anita Canyon photos
History

References

Canyons and gorges of California
San Gabriel Mountains
Landforms of Los Angeles County, California
Geography of the San Gabriel Valley
Sierra Madre, California
Angeles National Forest